Black Oak is an unincorporated community in Caldwell County, in the U.S. state of Missouri.

History
Black Oak was platted in the early 1870s, and named for a grove of black oak trees near the original town site. A post office called Black Oak was established in 1868, and remained in operation until 1904.

References

Unincorporated communities in Caldwell County, Missouri
1868 establishments in Missouri
Unincorporated communities in Missouri